Lloyd "Red" Doran (January 10, 1921 – June 15, 1995) was a Canadian ice hockey player who played 24 games in the National Hockey League for the Detroit Red Wings during the 1946–47 season. The rest of his career, which lasted from 1941 to 1951, was spent in various minor leagues.

Career statistics

Regular season and playoffs

External links
 

1921 births
1995 deaths
Canadian expatriates in the United States
Canadian ice hockey centres
Cleveland Barons (1937–1973) players
Denver Falcons players
Detroit Red Wings players
Ice hockey people from Ontario
Indianapolis Capitals players
Omaha Knights (AHA) players
Ontario Hockey Association Senior A League (1890–1979) players
St. Louis Flyers players
Sportspeople from Timmins